The Miami Boys Choir (MBC) is a boys choir specializing in Orthodox pop.

History 
In the early 1970s while studying in yeshivah in Toronto, Yerachmiel Begun created, directed, and recorded three successful albums with the Toronto (Pirchei) Boys Choir. However, in 1976 formed by Yerachmiel Begun as well, the Miami Boys Choir was part of a larger surge in popularity of Orthodox Jewish choral music. The use of an all-boy choir is related to a common interpretation of Orthodox Jewish law (halachah) of kol isha which they hold prohibits males above the age of majority from listening to non-familial females singing even on audio recordings.

While the group was formed in Miami Beach, Florida, after releasing the first few albums, Begun moved the choir to New York. Although he retained the "Miami" in the name of the group, subsequent albums were released with boys primarily from the New York/New Jersey area.

Yerachmiel Begun was the composer for almost all of the songs featured on his Toronto and Miami albums. In addition, he had composed many songs for a number of other Jewish music singers and groups including Simchatone, Kol Salonika (with Rabbi Boruch Chait), Kol Hakavod, Camp S'dei Chemed International, Mordechai Ben David, and Ira Heller. Yerachmiel conducted the boys choir on the NCSY record from 1979. In 1981, creating a fresh new sound in Jewish music, Yerachmiel composed the songs for the group and hit album title "Judaea". At the 6th annual HASC A Time For Music concert in 1993, paying tribute to Jewish composers, Begun was listed and mentioned as one of the Top Ten Composers of Jewish Music. Yerachmiel has worked side by side with a number of arrangers for his compositions, including Yisroel Lamm (the Neginah Orchestra), Suki Berry, Moshe Laufer, Mona Rosenblum, Hershel Lebovits, Vladimir Grinberg, and others.

Over the years, the choir's imaging has changed with the times. Originally called the "Miami Choir Boys," its name has alternated between "Miami Boys Choir" and "Yerachmiel Begun and the Miami Boys Choir." In addition, the album titles have slowly changed over time from just Hebrew/Aramaic titles (i.e., B'syata D'shamaya) to English and Hebrew together (e.g., Torah Today) and finally to the present format, which places "Miami" before the title (i.e., Miami Moshiach).

Compared to mainstream artists, the choir has not had spectacular results in terms of sales. However, in the Jewish music world, they are recognized as a success story. An example is their album released in 2005, Miami Revach, which reportedly sold over 15,000 copies in the first few weeks alone.

The Miami Boys Choir experienced a resurgence in popularity in 2022, owing to Begun's establishment of a TikTok account that posts clips of the group performing. One clip, a recording of 4 soloists (Yoshi Bender, Akiva Abramowitz, David Herskowitz, and Binyamin Abramowitz) performing an arrangement of Psalms 125:2 ('Yerushalayim') has accrued over 9.1 million views as of October 8. Users have been known to 'duet' the video offering glowing assessments of the soloists' performances, proclaiming their 'biases' (favorite members) within the group, in the same vein as fans of Korean idol groups.

DVDs 
Since very early on, the choir has released DVD and VHS versions of their live albums. In 2005, "Miami Revach" was released in high-definition video.

Prominent soloists and alumni 

 Yaakov Shwekey
 Ari Goldwag
 Nochum Stark
 Yitzy Spinner
 Nachman Seltzer
 Shloime Dachs
 Yitzchok Rosenthal (Shalsheles)
 Ari Saposh
 Mordechai Shapiro
 Avraham Solomon
 Elchonon Majeski
Ophie Nat

Dovid Pearlman
Isaac Benishai
Zalman Pollack
Moshe Blisko
Duvie Shapiro
David Herskowitz
 Yoshi Bender
 Akiva Abramowitz
 Binyamin Ravina Abramowitz
Yair Kenig
  Shaul Elson
  Yosef Schick
  Oded Kariti
 Benji Elson
 Sol Ayal
 Chanina Abramowitz
 Chiya Abramowitz
 Jeremy Herskowitz
 Ari Broyn
 Richie Ayal
 Max Herskowitz
 Albert Ayal
 Yehuda Gorkin
 Ari Rosner

Discography

References

External links
Miami Boys Choir – Official Website

American choirs
Choirs of children
Boys' and men's choirs
Jewish American musicians
Jewish musical groups
Musical groups established in 1977
Men in the United States
1977 establishments in Florida
Jews and Judaism in Miami Beach, Florida
Musical groups from Florida
Orthodox Judaism in Florida
Orthodox pop musicians